HMS Andromache was an  protected cruiser of the Royal Navy. William Henry White designed her, and she was built at Chatham Dockyard and launched on 14 August 1890. The total cost of construction was £186,234.

Andromache was initially allocated to A Division of the Fleet Reserve.

History
Ordered under the Naval Defence Act 1889, Andromache was built in 1890 at Chatham Dockyard. She was present at the Naval Review at Spithead on 26 June 1897 in celebration of the Diamond Jubilee of Queen Victoria. On 28 February 1900, the Andromache and her sister ship Apollo reportedly had been transferred from the Medway to the Devonport Fleet Reserve. With the exception of the previous year's manoeuvres Andromache had been unemployed since being built. On 27 June 1900, orders from Devonport were given for a naval mobilization to take place on Tuesday, 10 July. Commander Francis Alan Richard Bowles was appointed in command on 23 April 1902, and in June that year she was reported to serve as Naval Reserve drill ship at North Shields. She took part in the fleet review held at Spithead on 16 August 1902 for the coronation of King Edward VII.

On 1 February 1908, the torpedo gunboat  collided with Andromache in Harwich harbour, and had to be beached to avoid sinking. In September 1909, the ship completed conversion to a minelayer at Chatham Dockyard. Andromache took part in naval exercises off the East coast of Britain in July–August 1910, but on the night of 1 August, the steamship Neapolitan Prince, employed as a transport during the exercises, collided with Andromache on leaving Harwich harbour, crushing boats and davits on Andromaches starboard side. In August 1914 she joined the Minelayer Squadron, after which she was reduced to harbour duties.

References

Publications

External links
HMS Andromache, Index of 19th Century Naval Vessels

 

Apollo-class cruisers
Ships built in Chatham
1890 ships
World War I cruisers of the United Kingdom